Peter Graeme Ellis (4 March 1947 – 21 May 2013) was an Australian rules footballer who played with Fitzroy in the Victorian Football League (VFL).

Ellis started his career at Queensland club Mayne. He represented his state in 1966 and 1967.

A ruckman, he played for Fitzroy from 1969 to 1971, but managed just seven senior appearances.

He then joined Subiaco in the Western Australian National Football League and would go on to play 88 games for the club. In 1979 he represented Queensland again, at the Perth State of Origin Carnival.

References

1947 births
2013 deaths
Australian rules footballers from Queensland
Fitzroy Football Club players
Subiaco Football Club players
Mayne Australian Football Club players